Sichuan Provincial Women's Prison (四川省女子监狱 Sìchuān Shěng nǚzǐ jiānyù) is a women's prison in Yangma Town (养马镇), Jianyang, Chengdu, Sichuan,  away from the center of Chengdu (Jianyang was previously administered by Ziyang and not Chengdu). It is over  large. It became a women's prison in 1998. The Sichuan Provincial Administration of Prisons operates this facility.

It has a prison clinic/hospital with 44 employees.

See also
 List of prisons in Sichuan

References

External links
 四川省女子监狱 - Sichuan Provincial Administration of Prisons 
 四川省女子监狱 - Sichuan Provincial Administration of Prisons Prison Staff Information Network (四川省监狱管理局服刑人员帮教信息网) 
 四川省女子监狱医院先进事迹, Xinhua, May 31, 2015 – about the prison clinic/hospital
 四川省女子监狱举办中秋帮教文艺汇演, China News Service, September 25, 2015
 Story, 163.com
 Story, Sina Network

1998 establishments in China
Women's prisons in China
Buildings and structures in Chengdu
Jianyang, Sichuan